El Salvador, officially the City of El Salvador, is a 6th class component city in the province of Misamis Oriental, Philippines. According to the 2020 census, it has a population of 58,771 people.

The city serves as a pilgrimage site for Divine Mercy devotees, that is why it is also called the City of the Saviour, City of Mercy and the Divine Mercy City of the Philippines.

History 

El Salvador was created from the barrios of El Salvador and Molugan with their sitios known as Sala, Sambulawan, Sinaloc, Lagtang, Talaba, Kalabaylabay and Hinigdaan, formerly part of Cagayan de Misamis, Misamis Oriental, in 1948.

Hinigdaan was a ranch during the Spanish periods the areas covers the parts of Kalabay labay where the DJango's have 300 hectares of land and hundreds of cows..the area was famous of cattle ranching towards the areas of Tugasnon alubijid to Lourdes where the first Municipality was located now transferred to Alubijid and Sikitun of Gitagum Misamis Oriental.

Cityhood

On June 27, 2007, the municipality of El Salvador becomes a city in the province of Misamis Oriental after ratification of Republic Act 9435.

The Supreme Court declared the cityhood law of El Salvador and 15 other cities unconstitutional after a petition filed by the League of Cities of the Philippines in its ruling on November 18, 2008. On December 22, 2009, the cityhood law of El Salvador and 15 other municipalities regain its status as cities again after the court reversed its ruling on November 18, 2008. On August 23, 2010, the court reinstated its ruling on November 18, 2008, causing El Salvador and 15 cities to become regular municipalities. Finally, on February 15, 2011, El Salvador becomes a city again including the 15 municipalities declaring that the conversion to cityhood met all legal requirements.

After six years of legal battle, in its board resolution, the League of Cities of the Philippines acknowledged and recognized the cityhood of El Salvador and 15 other cities.

Geography 
El Salvador is located in the Province of Misamis Oriental in Northern Mindanao (Region X). It is bordered by the Municipality of Alubijid to the west, Opol to the east and Manticao and Naawan to the south. On the north, lies Macajalar Bay of the Bohol Sea.

Climate

Barangays
Administratively, El Salvador is subdivided into 15 barangays. One forms the center of the city (poblacion) whereas the other 14 are in the outlying areas. Some of them are even several kilometers away from the center of the city.

Demographics

Economy 

El Salvador hosts several companies, plants and factories west of Misamis Oriental. These are Asia Brewery, Tanduay Rhum, Virgin Cola Bottling Plant (Visayas and Mindanao region distributor), Highland Fresh Daily Products, Monark Equipment, Zest-O, WL Foods Corporation and Universal Robina Corporation.

With regards to financial institutions, Rural Bank of El Salvador and lending institutions such as FICCO, Oro Coop, M Lhuillier and others are accessible at office hours in this place.

Attractions 
 Divine Mercy Shrine (Misamis Oriental), located in the Divine Mercy Hills, PSB-Ulaliman which is overlooking Macajalar Bay. The shrine has a 50-foot statue of the Divine Mercy Christ, the biggest in Asia. It serves as a pilgrimage site for the Divine Mercy devotees. As a pilgrimage and sacred site, visitors are not allowed to wear shorts and other revealing clothing. Those who do so will be forced to cover themselves with a blue cloth provided by the shrine administrators.
Burias Island, located just a few kilometers off the coast of Molugan or about 3 km west of the town of Opol.
El Salvador Night Café and Market, is set up on Friday night at Barangay Poblacion. Tagnipa-ons and visitors gather to have barbecue, enjoy the live band music, beer, and also the great bargains from the nearby Night Market
Our Lady of Snows Parish Church, newly constructed church located within the city.
Abaga & Sikiop Falls, Located in barangay San Francisco de Asis.
Tag-ilas Falls, Located in barangay Hinigdaan.
Tuburan Spring, Located in barangay Poblacion .
House of Pasalubong, Located in Zone 2, Barangay Poblacion

Culture
Feast day:
 August 5 (Our Lady of Snows)
 August 16 (Saint Roch (aka San Roque))

Charter day:
 June 27

Infrastructure

Transportation 
El Salvador city can be reached via plane through Laguindingan Airport, then about less than 10 minutes bus ride east. Like any other place the national highway snakes through it. Visitors and locals can go around the city by just hailing a "sikad-sikad" or motorboat, "jeepneys" or motorcycles to the outlying barangays.

Communication 

PLDT and MISORTEL are among the major phone lines, also transmitters or "cell sites" for all major "telecom" providers like Globe, Smart and Dito are serviceable in this city. Internet access is also available. Internet cafes can be found in various places in within the city. Broadband service is also available.

References

External links 

 Official website of the City Government of El Salvador
 [ Philippine Standard Geographic Code]
 Philippine Census Information
 Local Governance Performance Management System

Cities in Misamis Oriental
Populated places established in 1948
1948 establishments in the Philippines
Catholic pilgrimage sites
Component cities in the Philippines